Mahmudabad-e Taleqani (also Romanized as Maḩmūdābād-e Ţāleqānī) is a village in Mahmudabad Rural District of Tazeh Kand District, Parsabad County, Ardabil province, Iran. At the 2006 census, its population was 1,970 in 413 households. The following census in 2011 counted 2,073 people in 513 households. The latest census in 2016 showed a population of 2,060 people in 589 households; it was the largest village in its rural district.

References 

Parsabad County

Towns and villages in Parsabad County

Populated places in Ardabil Province

Populated places in Parsabad County